Thorst is a surname. Notable people with the surname include:

Kjeld Thorst (born 1940), Danish footballer and manager
Søren Thorst (born 1965), Danish footballer, son of Kjeld

See also
Horst (given name)
Thorsten